Bathypterois dubius, the Mediterranean spiderfish, a lizardfish of the family Ipnopidae, is found in the Eastern Atlantic, as well as the Mediterranean and northwest Atlantic.

Like other species in its family, the Mediterranean spiderfish is hermaphroditic. It is solitary in nature and feeds on mysids and copepods. It reaches a length of  SL.

References
 

Ipnopidae
Fish described in 1888